Budalalu (also Romanized as Būdālālū; also known as Būd Alāl, Būd Ālān, Bū Dallāl, and Būdāllān) is a village in Fuladlui-ye Jonubi Rural District of Hir District, Ardabil County, Ardabil province, Iran. At the 2006 census, its population was 451 in 101 households. The following census in 2011 counted 380 people in 94 households. The latest census in 2016 showed a population of 352 people in 100 households; it is the largest village in its rural district.

References 

Ardabil County

Towns and villages in Ardabil County

Populated places in Ardabil Province

Populated places in Ardabil County